General elections were held in the Netherlands on 3 July 1929. The Roman Catholic State Party remained the largest party in the House of Representatives, winning 30 of the 100 seats.

Results

References

General elections in the Netherlands
Netherlands
1929 in the Netherlands
July 1929 events
1929 elections in the Netherlands